is a Japanese actor. He graduated from Aoyama Gakuin University. Katsuno's debut was as a detective Texas in the television series Taiyō ni Hoero! in 1974 and he won great popularity through the role. The episode his character Texas was killed recorded 42.5% audience rating, it was highest audience rating in Taiyō ni Hoero!.

Filmography

Film

Television

References

External links
Official Site 

1949 births
Living people
People from Kumamoto Prefecture
Japanese male actors
Aoyama Gakuin University alumni